Karimabad (also Romanized as Karīmābād; also known as Karīmābād-e Khāleşeh) is a village in Karimabad Rural District of Sharifabad District of Pakdasht County, Tehran province, Iran. At the 2006 National Census, its population was 2,332 in 567 households. The following census in 2011 counted 2,362 people in 618 households. The latest census in 2016 showed a population of 2,425 people in 692 households; it was the largest village in its rural district.

References 

Pakdasht County

Populated places in Tehran Province

Populated places in Pakdasht County